Khvoshchin is a rural locality (a khutor) in Lebyazhensky Selsoviet Rural Settlement, Kursky District, Kursk Oblast, Russia. Population:

Geography 
The khutor is located in the Mlodat River basin (a left tributary of the Seym), 82 km from the Russia–Ukraine border, 13 km south-east of Kursk, 2.5 km from the selsoviet center – Cheryomushki.

 Climate
Khvoshchin has a warm-summer humid continental climate (Dfb in the Köppen climate classification).

Transport 
Khvoshchin is located on the road of intermunicipal significance  (Kursk – Petrin), 10 km from the nearest railway halt 465 km (railway line Lgov I — Kursk).

The rural locality is situated 20 km from Kursk Vostochny Airport, 106 km from Belgorod International Airport and 209 km from Voronezh Peter the Great Airport.

References

Notes

Sources

Rural localities in Kursky District, Kursk Oblast